Simone Marinaro (born 15 January 1993) is an Italian rugby union player, currently playing for Top12 side Fiamme Oro. He is also an additional player for the Pro14 side Zebre. His preferred position is scrum-half.

After playing for Italy Under 20 in 2013, from 2015 to 2017 he also was named in the Emerging Italy squad.

Zebre
Marinaro was named as an additional player in November 2020 for 2020–21 Pro14 season. He made his Zebre debut in Round 6 of the 2020–21 Pro14 against Munster.

References

External links
itsrugby.co.uk Profile

1993 births
Living people
Italian rugby union players
Zebre Parma players
Rugby union scrum-halves